William Thomas Ellis (5 November 1895 – 18 November 1939) was an English footballer born in Wolverhampton who played in the Football League for Sunderland, Birmingham, Lincoln City and York City as a winger.

He made his debut for Sunderland against Middlesbrough on 6 March 1920 in a 2–0 win at Ayresome Park. During his time at Sunderland, from 1920 to 1927, he made 192 league appearances and scored 32 goals. He linked up well with Charlie Buchan for whom he created many goals from the left wing. He went on to play for Birmingham, Lincoln City and York City, and died in Sunderland in 1939 at the age of 44.

References

1895 births
1939 deaths
Footballers from Wolverhampton
English footballers
Association football wingers
Sunderland A.F.C. players
Birmingham City F.C. players
Lincoln City F.C. players
York City F.C. players
English Football League players
Willenhall F.C. players
English Football League representative players
Bilston Town F.C. players